Talamantes may refer to:
Talamantes, a municipality in Zaragoza, Spain
Andrade Corner, California (formerly, Talamantes), an unincorporated community
Melchor de Talamantes (1765–1809), Mexican independence advocate
Rafael Aguilar Talamantes (1940–2016), Mexican politician